David Hersey (born November 30, 1939) is a lighting designer who has designed the lighting for over 250 plays, musicals, operas, and ballets. His work has been seen in most corners of the globe and his awards include the Tony Award for Best Lighting Design for Evita, Cats, and Les Misérables, the Drama Desk Award for Outstanding Lighting Design for Cats, Miss Saigon, and Equus, and the 1996 Laurence Olivier Award for Lighting Design.

Early life and education 
David Hersey was born in Rochester, New York and attended Oberlin College.

Career
Hersey has been the lighting designer for National Theatre, Royal Shakespeare Company and West End productions, as well as opera at the English National Opera (among others) and ballet at the Royal Ballet.  He has been the lighting designer for Broadway productions, starting with Evita in 1980 through Equus in 2008.

Hersey has also been active in the world of theme parks in Florida and Italy, as well as lighting extravaganzas at The Mirage, Treasure Island Hotel and Casino, and Bellagio hotels in Las Vegas. He is the founder of DHA Designs, which concentrates on the design of specialist architectural lighting. For ten years he was lighting consultant to the Royal National Theatre and is a past chairman of the Association of Lighting Designers.

Most recently he has taken on the position of lighting designer for the play Fiddler on the roof done by CFT

Personal life
In 1967 he moved to London, England. Married to Demetra Maraslis, his children are: a daughter Miranda Hersey, b. 1969 (from previous marriage); a son Demetri Alexander Hersey, b. 1978; and a daughter Ellen Katherine Hersey, born 1980.

Awards and nominations

References

External links

Credits Broadway World
Article, July 1, 2002 livedesignonline.com
Biography, equusonbroadway.com
Biography, creativemediamanagement.com

1939 births
Living people
Dora Mavor Moore Award winners
American lighting designers
Oberlin College alumni
Tony Award winners